Farzaneh Rezasoltani (born September 13, 1985) is a cross-country skier competing for Iran. She will compete for Iran at the 2014 Winter Olympics in the 10 kilometre classical race.

References

1985 births
Living people
Iranian female cross-country skiers
Cross-country skiers at the 2014 Winter Olympics
Olympic cross-country skiers of Iran